The L. A. Derby Dolls (LADD) is Los Angeles' original women's quad-skate banked track roller derby league. It was founded in October 2003 by Rebecca Ninburg (a.k.a. Demolicious) and Wendy Templeton (a.k.a. Thora Zeen). The league is composed of more than 120 women divided into five teams who skate on a banked track.

LADD plays real, unscripted roller derby with rules and referees. Like most modern roller derby, the league is do-it-yourself and 100% skater run. It is all volunteer work; there are no paid athletes. The L.A. Derby Dolls are one of only thirteen banked track leagues in the United States. Demolicious and Thora Zeen's vision for the league is to legitimize the sport of roller derby and to promote businesses and organizations run by women.

In January 2012, the L.A. Derby Dolls were a founding member of the Roller Derby Coalition of Leagues.

In February 2018, Los Angeles Derby Dolls was accepted as an apprentice member of the Women's Flat Track Derby Association (WFTDA).

Teams
There are five teams within the Los Angeles Derby Dolls league. The four home teams are: the Fight Crew, the Sirens, the Tough Cookies and the Varsity Brawlers. The fifth team is the Derby Dolls X, which are the L.A. Derby Doll's all-star team that competes on a national level.

The L.A. Derby Dolls also have their own referee team called "The Enforcers".

Community service

The L.A. Derby Dolls have partnered with other organizations for community service work such as the Human Rights Campaign, Children of the Night, Big Sunday, AIDS Project Los Angeles (APLA), Children's Hospital Los Angeles, the St. Vincent Medical Center (Los Angeles), the American Diabetes Association (ADA), and with After-School All-Stars (ASAS) to help teach young girls the sport of roller derby.

Because of their community service outreach programs, in 2009, the L.A. Derby Dolls were honored as a Treasure of Los Angeles by the Central City Organization, putting them in a category with the likes of Magic Johnson and the LA Dodgers.

The LA Derby Dolls have also been hosting the Down Syndrome Association of Los Angeles (DSALA) critically acclaimed annual fundraising event called TwentyWonder — “A Carnival Of The Mind” since 2011. All proceeds benefit individuals born with Trisomy 21 (Down syndrome) living in the greater Los Angeles area.

Training

LADD also has a junior league for girls ages 7–17 to learn the sport of roller derby and to learn empowerment, community, leadership, and athleticism.

The Derby Dolls offer a roller derby fitness program called Derby Por Vida (DPV) for the public to learn how to play roller derby which is open to both men and women.

DPV is also considered a stepping stone into the LA Derby Dolls Fresh Meat program where women train to become team skaters for the league.

Co-ed scrimmages are offered during wRECk League. All types of scrimmage-safe skaters from freshmeat to retired as well as referees can enjoy either flat or banked track game play during wRECk League practice.

Every March, LADD brings in top roller derby trainers (both flat and banked track) to teach at their camp called March RADness. Space is limited and sells out each year.

Many skaters from around the world visit Los Angeles and the Derby Dolls love to have them try out the banked track.

Media
The Derby Dolls have been featured on NBC's Kath and Kim, VH1's "Rock of Love," Chelsea Lately, CNN, FOX News and several LADD skaters appear in Whip It!, which was written by former L.A. Derby Dolls (and original Sirens) skater Shauna “Maggie Mayhem” Cross. They were also featured on episodes of CSI Miami, Bones and Bunheads.

Skaters
In addition to Shauna Cross, notable Derby Dolls skaters include screenwriter and author Pamela Ribon, journalist and author Alex Cohen, actress Emma Dumont, and roller derby coach Bonnie D.Stroir. Comedian Blaine Capatch has been an announcer for the league.

Sister League
The Los Angeles Derby Dolls also has a sister league located in San Diego, California called the San Diego Derby Dolls (SDDD).

References

External links
Back on a roll with L.A Derby Dolls--Los Angeles Times Story
Eric Garcetti Blog—Treasures of Los Angeles
Derby Dolls Help Out on Whip It
Official LADD Website/Rules
Derby Dolls Honored at Human Rights Campaign Event
San Diego Derby Dolls Play Real Roller Derby
g4 Attack of the Show Roller Derby
LADD Official Press Archive/ Links Collection
Help the Derby Dolls
'SNL' actress trained to skate for roller derby movie 'Whip It.'
On a Roll
LEARN HOW TO SKATE WITH THE LA DERBY DOLLS
Derby Dolls: Banked Track Roller Derby Explained

Roller derby leagues in California
Derb
Roller derby leagues established in 2003
Roller Derby Coalition of Leagues
Women's Flat Track Derby Association Apprentice
2003 establishments in California